Sidney Wilson Prest (1943–2015) was a Canadian politician, who was elected to the Nova Scotia House of Assembly in the 2009 provincial election. He was a lifelong resident of Mooseland, Nova Scotia, and represented the electoral district of Eastern Shore as a member of the New Democratic Party. Prest was defeated when he ran for re-election in the 2013 election. Prest died on December 14, 2015.

Electoral record

|-
 
|Liberal
|Kevin Murphy
|align="right"|3,770
|align="right"|52.99
|align="right"|
|-
 
|New Democratic Party
|Sid Prest
|align="right"|1,922
|align="right"|27.01
|align="right"|
|-
 
|Progressive Conservative
|Steve Brine
|align="right"|1,423
|align="right"|20.00
|align="right"|
|}

|-
 
|New Democratic Party
|Sidney Prest
|align="right"|3,627
|align="right"|49.54
|align="right"|
|-
 
|Progressive Conservative
|Bill Dooks
|align="right"|2,517
|align="right"|34.38
|align="right"|
|-
 
|Liberal Party
|Loretta Day Halleran
|align="right"|968
|align="right"|13.47
|align="right"|
|-

|}

References

Nova Scotia New Democratic Party MLAs
1943 births
2015 deaths
21st-century Canadian politicians